Farid Majari (also spelled Fareed) is the director of the Goethe-Institut in Los Angeles. The Goethe-Institut is the official Cultural Institute of the Federal Republic of Germany, which operates worldwide. Fareed Majari had previous postings as country director of the Goethe-Institut in Lebanon (Beirut) and in the Palestinian Territories (Ramallah) as well as postings in Moscow and Munich. In 1995 and 1996 he was a visiting professor at the University of Connecticut. He is the producer and co-writer of the TV series Matabb (Speed Bump) set in Ramallah in the West Bank.

References

External links

 The Japan Foundation (offline)

Year of birth missing (living people)
Living people
German mass media people
German people of Iranian descent
Iraqi film directors